Salangsdalen Chapel is a chapel of the Church of Norway in Bardu Municipality in Troms og Finnmark county, Norway. It is located in the southern part of Bardu in the Salangsdalen valley, just east of the European route E06 highway and not far from the Polar Park. It is an annex chapel for the Bardu parish which is part of the Senja prosti (deanery) in the Diocese of Nord-Hålogaland. The brown, wooden church was built in 1981 using plans drawn up by the architects Dalsbø and Østgård. The church seats about 110 people.

See also
List of churches in Nord-Hålogaland

References

Bardu
Churches in Troms
Wooden churches in Norway
20th-century Church of Norway church buildings
Churches completed in 1981
1981 establishments in Norway
Long churches in Norway